Direct from L.A. is an album by the Great Jazz Trio featuring pianist Hank Jones, bassist Ron Carter and drummer Tony Williams, recorded using direct metal mastering in 1977 for the Japanese East Wind label.

Reception 

AllMusic awarded the album 4 stars and its review by Ken Dryden states, "If there's a bone to pick with this well-recorded CD, it is the miserly length of just 29 minutes".

Track listing
 "A Night in Tunisia" (Dizzy Gillespie, Frank Paparelli) – 8:00
 "'Round About Midnight" (Thelonious Monk, Cootie Williams, Bernie Hanighen) – 6:13
 "Satin Doll" (Duke Ellington, Billy Strayhorn) – 8:26
 "My Funny Valentine"  (Richard Rodgers, Lorenz Hart) – 6:20

Personnel 
Hank Jones – piano
Ron Carter – bass
Tony Williams – drums

References 

1978 albums
Great Jazz Trio albums
East Wind Records albums